Metabetaeus mcphersonae is a marine species of alpheid shrimp native to French Polynesia. The species has only been recorded to live in coral reef habitats off the coast of Moorea, Society Islands, French Polynesia. Unlike other species within the genus that live in anchialine pools, M. mcphersonae is associated exclusively with marine coral reef habitat.

References 

Crustaceans described in 2010